The Turtle Bay Resort is a resort with cottages on the North Shore of Oahu island in Hawaii.

Description

The resort is about a 50-minute drive from Honolulu, between Kahuku, Hawaii to the east and Kawela Bay, Hawaii to the west. The resort owns 858 acres (3.47 km2) of land with five miles of ocean front at Turtle Bay, and features 410 hotel rooms and suites, including the Premier Rooms on the 6th Floor; 42 Beach Cottages that were refreshed in 2015; and manages numerous Ocean Villas,  which are larger 2-BR to 4-BR units. The hotel recently unveiled a $45 million resort-wide, eco-sensitive renovation enhancing food and beverage operations, event staging and guest experiences. The hotel was built with three wings on a small peninsula which provides every room with an ocean view. The resort has a variety of restaurants, including Surfer The Bar, a partnership with Surfer Magazine, and The Point Sunset and Pool Bar. The resort also features The Guide Post, a new concept on the traditional hotel concierge, but more interactive and a key component of the Turtle Bay's positioning as an experiential resort. Turtle Bay Resort sits just north of the Kuilima Estates condominium complexes along both of its golf courses, at 21°42′19″N 157°59′55″W.

History
The hotel opened in May 1972 as Del Webb's Kuilima Resort Hotel & Country Club.
In the Hawaiian language kui lima means "joining hands".
It was built by casino developer Del Webb (1899–1974) to be the first casino on the island; a gaming initiative was on the ballot in the mid-1970s but it did not pass. Hyatt Hotels later took over the property and it operated first as the Kulima Hyatt Resort Hotel and later as the Hyatt Kulima Resort until August 1983 when Hilton Hotels & Resorts assumed management, and the hotel was renamed Turtle Bay Hilton and Country Club. Hilton ceased managing the property on August 31, 2001, and the hotel became "Turtle Bay Golf and Tennis Resort".

A potential development deal with Starwood fell through in July 2007.
Although much expansion had been approved in 1985, local opposition had developed against the plans.
Governor Linda Lingle suggested the state buy the property in 2008. The Trust for Public Land also tried to raise funds for the preservation effort.
Two offers were made by the state in August and November 2008 that would have included surrounding open space, but they were not accepted.

After a threat of foreclosure of investor Oaktree Capital Management from Credit Suisse, a new consortium of investors took over the resort in February 2010.
 it was managed and operated by Benchmark Hospitality International. In December 2013, the management of the resort was split between Replay Resorts, based in Vancouver, British Columbia and Benchmark Hospitality International.
After four years of court battles, the Hawaii Supreme Court ruled in July 2010 that a Supplemental Environmental Impact Statement must be filed for new development. 

The Blackstone Group bought the hotel, golf courses and surrounding land from the lender consortium in 2017, with plan to renovate the dated hotel building, as well as constructing two new hotel resorts nearby. The hotel ceased operations in 2020 during the COVID-19 pandemic and reopened in July 2021 while renovation continues.

Activities
The resort is several miles away from surf spots including Waimea Bay, the Banzai Pipeline, and Sunset Beach.
The two golf courses are named after designers Arnold Palmer and George Fazio.
The Palmer Course was the site of the Turtle Bay Championship, a PGA Champions Tour Event held from 2001 through 2008, and the Fazio Course has hosted the LPGA Tour's Hawaiian Open.
The runways of the World War II era Kahuku Army Airfield have been absorbed into the fairways of the golf courses.
The James Campbell National Wildlife Refuge preserves a small pond adjacent to a golf course.

In 1999, the resort hosted the final Big Mele, a rock festival that had been held for the previous six years at Kualoa Ranch.

Films and TV shows have been filmed on or near the Turtle Bay Resort. The hotel has been the setting for episodes of Hawaii 5-0, Magnum P.I., Full House, Cougar Town and the short-lived Fox TV series North Shore. The resort featured as the setting for the reunion-movie Baywatch: Hawaiian Wedding, for the 2008 film Forgetting Sarah Marshall, and the 2016 film Mike and Dave Need Wedding Dates.
Preserving the undeveloped setting for film locations was one reason given by opponents to the expansion. The Hills cast have filmed at the Turtle Bay resort in Season 5.

References

External links

Hotels in Hawaii
Resorts in Hawaii
Buildings and structures in Honolulu County, Hawaii
Tourist attractions in Honolulu County, Hawaii
Hotels established in 1972
1972 establishments in Hawaii
Golf clubs and courses in Hawaii